William C. Wilson was an American lawyer and politician. 

He was the Republican boss of the Twenty-Seventh Assembly District in New York City, and had a law office at 55, Liberty Street.

On May 3, 1900, he was appointed by Comptroller William J. Morgan one of the first five New York State Transfer Tax Appraisers for New York County under the new transfer tax law. He was First Deputy Comptroller under Otto Kelsey, and became Acting Comptroller upon Kelsey's resignation in May 1906. After months of delay, he finally was appointed New York State Comptroller by Governor Frank W. Higgins on November 8, 1906, to serve for the remainder of Kelsey's unexpired term.

Sources
 The choice for tax appraisers, in NYT on April 30, 1900
 His appointment as tax appraiser, in NYT on May 4, 1900
 Kelsey's appointment as Supt. of Insurance, and resignation as Comptroller, in NYT on May 3, 1906
 His appointment as Comptroller, in NYT on November 9, 1906
 Political Graveyard (name misspelled)

Year of birth missing
Year of death missing
New York State Comptrollers
Lawyers from New York City
New York (state) Republicans
20th-century American politicians